Amartey is a surname. Notable people with the surname include:

Abednego Feehi Okoe Amartey (born 1967), Ghanaian academic
Daniel Amartey (born 1994), Ghanaian footballer
Joachim Amartey Quaye (died 1982), Ghanaian politician
Prince Amartey (born 1944), Ghanaian boxer
McJordan Amartey (died 2018), Ghanaian Actor